Andriy Yevhenovych Kostin (born 17 April 1973) is a Ukrainian lawyer and politician. , he is a member of the Verkhovna Rada, the Ukrainian parliament, since he was elected to it 2019.  Kostin was a candidate in the 2021 competition to become the new head of the Ukrainian Specialized Anti-Corruption Prosecutor's Office (SAPO). Civil society organisations Transparency International Ukraine, Automaidan, Anti-Corruption Action Center and Dejure stated that Kostin did not satisfy the integrity criteria of the competition. Kostin was not selected.  Kostin was the Head of the Verkhovna Rada Legal Policy Committee for two years, from 2020 to 2022. On 27 July 2022, Kostin was voted by the Verkhovna Rada as the Prosecutor General of Ukraine.

Education
Andriy Kostin studied law from 1990 to 1995 at Odesa University. He qualified as a lawyer in 1995.

Lawyer
Kostin was an attorney at Polonsky & Partners in Odesa from 1995 to 1998. He became Deputy Director and then Director of Pravo, a legal firm, starting in 1998. Kostin has held several roles in lawyers' organisations in Odesa and internationally. He was a member of the International Bar Association Council from 2013 to 2015.

Member of parliament
Kostin served as a member of Verkhovna Rada (the Ukrainian parliament) from the Servant of the People party from 2019 to 2022.

Competition for head of SAPO
In 2021, a commission was established to interview candidates for the head of the Ukrainian Specialized Anti-Corruption Prosecutor's Office (SAPO), a key position for resolving corruption in Ukraine. Kostin was a candidate.

In May 2021, the civil society organisations Transparency International Ukraine, Automaidan, Anti-Corruption Action Center and Dejure described Kostin as one of the candidates with "significant violations and a large discrepancy between these candidates and the integrity criteria" of the competition. The Open Register of National Public Actors of Ukraine stated that Kostin's wife was an assistant consultant for fellow Servant of the People parliamentarian and committee member Maksym Dyrdin, whose own wife was an assistant consultant to Kostin. The civil society organisations described this as "possible nepotism". In 2019, Kostin sold two flats in Odesa for a total of  million without reporting the sale to the National Agency for Prevention of Corruption (NAPC).

Kostin was among the 37 candidates who qualified for an interview, which was scheduled for 4 June 2021. Olena Shcherban, a lawyer of the Anti-Corruption Action Center, stated that Kostin should have been ineligible under the criteria for political neutrality, since he was a member of the Servant of the People party and was the head of the Verkhovna Rada legal policy committee. In his "integrity interview", Kostin was questioned by the commission about his visit to Crimea, occupied by Russian security forces. Following his integrity interview, Kostin did not qualify for further steps in the competition.

Legislative actions
In July 2021, while legislation for creating the Ukrainian Ethics Council was being debated, Kostin proposed an amendment to reduce the mandate of international members of the Council from six years, as proposed by the Venice Commission, to three years. His amendment was rejected.

Minsk agreements
In November 2021, as deputy chair of the Ukrainian delegation to the Trilateral Contact Group on Ukraine negotiating the Minsk agreements that aimed to resolve the War in Donbas, Kostin stated that the Russian delegation "didn't want to continue" negotiations on a draft law for local self-government in Donbas.

Prosecutor General
On 27 July 2022, Kostin was voted by Verkhovna Rada, the Ukrainian Parliament, as the new Prosecutor General of Ukraine, in replacement of Iryna Venediktova.

Scandals

Refusal to initiate criminal proceedings 
On 3 November 2022,  Kostin, refused to open a case against his former party colleague Iryna Allakhverdieva for receiving a gift of UAH 20 million within the prescribed period. She also received a watch DEFY MIDNIGHT for 310 thousand UAH, encrusted with 11 white diamonds.

References

External links
 law cabinet Pravo 

1973 births
Living people
Ninth convocation members of the Verkhovna Rada
Servant of the People (political party) politicians
21st-century Ukrainian lawyers
Odesa University alumni
Politicians from Odesa
General Prosecutors of Ukraine